The R818 road is a regional road in Dublin, Ireland.

The official definition of the R818 from the Roads Act 1993 (Classification of Regional Roads) Order 2012 states:

R818: Terenure - Walkinstown Roundabout, County Dublin

Between its junction with R137 at Templeogue Road Terenure in the city of Dublin and its junction with R112 at Walkinstown Roundabout in the county of South Dublin via Terenure Road West in the city of Dublin: Kimmage Road West and Cromwellsfort Road in both the city of Dublin and the county of South Dublin.

See also
Roads in Ireland
Regional road

References

Regional roads in the Republic of Ireland
Roads in County Dublin